Tetrachloro-m-xylene (tetrachlorometaxylene, or TCMX) is the organochlorine compound with the formula C6Cl4(CH3)2. It is the chlorinated derivative of m-xylene in which the four aromatic hydrogen atoms are replaced by chlorine.  It is prepared by ferric chloride-catalyzed reaction of the xylene with chlorine.

TCMX is used as an internal standard in the analysis of organochlorides, particularly organochloride pesticides.

References

Chlorobenzenes